Frederico Abreu Sousa (born Lisbon, 18 August 1978) is a former Portuguese rugby union player and a current coach. He played as a centre. His team was Direito.

He was one of the most experienced players for the Portuguese squad, and was a member of his country squad that entered the 2007 Rugby World Cup finals. He played three matches, with Scotland, Italy and Romania. He had 47 caps for his national team, from 2000 to 2007, with 4 tries scored, 20 points in aggregate.

He was the head coach of the Portugal national rugby team from 2013 to 2014, but failed to qualify his country to the 2015 Rugby World Cup. He was replaced by João Luís Pinto in July 2014.
Sousa was also the coach of representative team Lusitanos XV that compete in the European Challenge Cup since 2013.

References

External links
Frederico Sousa International Statistics

1978 births
Living people
Portuguese rugby union players
Portuguese rugby union coaches
Rugby union centres
Rugby union players from Lisbon
Portugal international rugby union players